R712 road may refer to:
 R712 road (Ireland)
 R712 road (South Africa)